Isabella FitzRoy may refer to:
 Isabella FitzRoy, Duchess of Grafton (née Bennet, 1668–1723), mother of Charles FitzRoy, 2nd Duke of Grafton
 Isabella Seymour-Conway, Countess of Hertford (née FitzRoy), daughter of Charles FitzRoy, 2nd Duke of Grafton